What the Buddha Taught, by Theravadin Walpola Rahula, is a widely used introductory book on Buddhism for non-Buddhists. Using quotes from the sutras, Rahula gives his personal interpretation of what he regards to be Buddhism's essential teachings, including the Four Noble Truths, the Buddhist mind, the Noble Eightfold Path, meditation and mental development, and the world today.

Background and reception
Rahula's book is an example of "Protestant Buddhism," the Sinhalese version of Buddhist modernism. See also Richard Gombrich, Theravada Buddhism, chapter 7, Protestant Buddhism; and David L. McMahan (2008), The Making of Buddhist Modernism, Oxford University Press, p.50-52.}}}}

Publication data
 Rahula, Walpola What The Buddha Taught'', Oneworld Publications: Oxford, (1959) (revised 1974).

Notes

References

Sources

External links
 What the Buddha Taught (e-text)

Buddhism studies books
Books about Gautama Buddha